Oscar Wayman Holmes (31 January 1916, Dunbar, West Virginia – 5 November 2001, Mitchellville, Maryland) was a trailblazing Naval Aviator in World War II and civilian flight controller, the first African American in each position.

Biography
Holmes graduated from Garnet High School in Charleston, West Virginia, in 1932, West Virginia State College in 1936 with a B.S. and Ohio State University the following year with a master's degree in chemistry. He taught chemistry (a subject he did not like) for three years at Claflin College, a historically black school in Orangeburg, South Carolina. In 1940, he went to work for the Erie Lighting Company in Erie, Pennsylvania, as a chemical analyst.

Wanting to become a pilot, he won a scholarship and enrolled in the US government's Civilian Pilot Training Program. He obtained his private pilot's license by 1941. 

Later that year, he applied to become an air traffic controller for the Civil Aeronautics Administration, a position that required a pilot's license and a college degree. The application and his acceptance were both handled by telegram. After training, he was assigned to the New York traffic control center, becoming the first African-American traffic controller. He was very light skinned, and his superiors were unaware he was not white until he had to fill out a questionnaire. He did well, and Robert L. Johnston, the chief controller at the center, told Holmes he had recommended him for promotion. However, it never came. Holmes thought for 15 years that Johnston had lied to him, but in 1957 learned that higher ups had rejected him.

In August 1942, with the United States now in World War II, Holmes read in The New York Times that the United States Navy was offering reserve commissions to those with a pilot's license and 125 hours of flying time to become flight instructors or deliver aircraft. Despite admitting that he only had 90 hours in the air, he was accepted. He was sworn in on 28 September, with his commission dated 14 September. The Navy was, at that time, still segregated – African Americans were only accepted as steward's mates, not as officers – but once again the authorities assumed he was white. Holmes later admitted he knew about the Navy's policy, "but they didn't ask me and I didn't tell them". By the time his superiors discovered their mistake, it would have been embarrassing to admit it, so they did nothing. (In fact, he continued to work, eat and sleep alongside white officers, unlike other African-American servicemen, who were segregated.) He successfully completed flight instructor training at Colgate University, Naval Air Station Corpus Christi, Naval Air Station Glenview and Naval Air Station New Orleans, and was made a Naval Aviator on 30 June 1943. However, while his classmates became flight instructors, he was given a desk job in Manhattan, interviewing prospective cadets. 

In the fall of 1943, the Navy announced that all ensigns with a date of rank of 1 October or earlier would be promoted to lieutenant (j.g.). Holmes, however, had to pass a flight check before being promoted. 

Bored, he requested a transfer to become a flight instructor or aircraft delivery pilot. In April 1944, he was transferred to Naval Air Station Dallas, where he delivered T-6 Texan trainer aircraft. In June, he was assigned to Air Ferry Squadron 3 on Mare Island, California, where he flew different types of aircraft from factories to bases in the United States.

After the end of the war, he returned to civilian life in 1946. He returned to work as a traffic controller at the New York center. He also attended Brooklyn Law School part-time and earned two degrees: an LL.B. in 1954 and a LL.M. in 1955. He passed the New York State bar and opened a part-time practice. However, he went to work at the Federal Aviation Administration, the successor to the Civil Aeronautics Administration, and remained there until his retirement in 1973.

Oscar Wayman Holmes died in Mitchellville, Maryland, on 5 November 2001. He and his wife Augusta Thomas Holmes had three or four children.

References

See also
 Jesse L. Brown (1926–1950), the second African-American Naval Aviator, the first knowingly accepted by the Navy as an African American

1916 births
2001 deaths
Air traffic controllers
African-American United States Navy personnel
Brooklyn Law School alumni
Claflin University faculty
Federal Aviation Administration personnel
People from Dunbar, West Virginia
United States Naval Aviators
United States Navy pilots of World War II
West Virginia State University alumni